Levenhookia preissii, Preiss's stylewort, is a dicotyledonous plant that belongs to the genus Levenhookia (family Stylidiaceae).

Description and habitat
Flowers are pink to red and bloom from September to January in its native range. L. preissii is endemic to southwestern Western Australia where it grows in grey or black sandy peat soils in swampy areas.

References

Endemic flora of Western Australia
Eudicots of Western Australia
preissii
Plants described in 1845
Taxa named by Otto Wilhelm Sonder